Fries is a surname. Notable people with the surname include:
Adelaide Fries (1871–1949), scholar of the history and genealogy of Moravians
Amalie Fries (1823–1887), stage actor
Amos Fries (1873–1963), American army general
Bengt Fredrik Fries (1799–1839), Swedish zoologist
Bernhard Fries (1820–1879), German painter
Charles Arthur Fries (1854–1940), American painter
Charles Carpenter Fries (1887–1967), American structural linguist and language teacher
David Fries (born 1960), American scientist
Ed Fries, American video game programmer and entrepreneur
Elias Magnus Fries (1794–1878), Swedish botanist
Ellen Fries (1855–1900), Swedish writer
Ernst Fries (1801–1833), German painter
Fabrice Fries (born 1960), French business executive
Francis Henry Fries (1855–1931), American textile businessman and industrialist
Frank W. Fries (1893–1980), American politician
Fritz Rudolf Fries (1935–2014), German writer and translator
George Fries (1799–1866), physician and politician
Gladys Fries Harriman (1896–1983), American philanthropist
Hanni Fries, Swiss orienteering competitor
Hans Fries (1460–1520), Swiss painter
Heinrich de Fries (1887–1938), German architect
Hjalmar Fries (1891–1973), Norwegian actor and theater director
Hugo Friedrich Fries (1818–1889), German judge
Jacob H. Fries (born 1978), American journalist
Jakob Friedrich Fries (1773–1843), German philosopher
James F. Fries (1938–2021), American rheumatologist and author
Johann von Fries (1719–1785), counsellor, director of the imperial silk factories, industrialist and banker
Johannes Fries (1505–1565), Swiss theologian
John Edmund Fries (1885–1955), American football player and coach
John Fries (1764–1825), American tax rebel and namesake of the Fries' Rebellion
Karl Friedrich Fries (1831–1871), painter
Karl Theophil Fries (1875–1962), German chemist
Kenny Fries (born 1960), American memoirist and poet
Kristina Fries (born 1962), Swedish sport shooter
Liv Lisa Fries (born 1990), German actress
Matthew Fries (born 1968), American jazz pianist, composer, and educator
Mike Fries (born 1963), businessman
Otto Fries (1887–1938), American film actor
Pascal Fries (born 1972), German neurophysiologist
Pete Fries (1857–1937), American baseball player
Philipp Fries (1882–1950), German politician
Pia Fries (born 1955), Swiss painter
Robert Elias Fries (1876–1966), Swedish botanist
Sebastian Fries (born 1993), German footballer
Sherwood Fries (1920–1986), American football player
Theodor Magnus Fries (1832–1913), Swedish botanist
Thore Christian Elias Fries (1886–1930), Swedish botanist
Tom Fries (born 1942), American politician
Walter Fries (1894–1982), German general
Will Fries (born 1998), American football player
 William Dale Fries (1928-2022), American country singer-songwriter better known by his stage name C. W. McCall
Melanie Fries (born 1953), American Educator, Musician, Charitable and Volunteer works

Characters 
Victor Fries, a DC Comics character, also known as Mr. Freeze
Nora Fries, a DC Comics character, wife to Mr. Freeze

See also 
Defries, surname
Friess, surname

German-language surnames
Ethnonymic surnames